Newtown Association Football Club is a Welsh football club based in Newtown, Powys, which plays in the Cymru Premier. Newtown are one of only two clubs that can claim unbroken membership of the league since its formation in 1992, with the other club being Aberystwyth Town.

The club was founded in 1875 as Newtown White Stars, and was one of the founder members of the Football Association of Wales. Newtown White Stars, which appeared in the first Welsh Cup match on 13 October 1877, is believed to have merged with Newtown Excelsior to form the current Newtown AFC in time to be Welsh Cup finalists in 1885 and 1888.

The club plays at Latham Park, Newtown, which accommodates 5,000 spectators. They are the only top flight football club in Powys.

History 
For a full history see; List of football seasons involving Newtown AFC and its predecessor clubs

For most of the years since the 1920s the club operated in the Mid-Wales League, or the Central Wales League as it was sometimes known, winning the championship in 1975–76, 1978–79, 1981–82, 1986–87 and 1987–88 and on the strength of this record, the club gained entry to the English league system in the Northern Premier League.

In 1992 the club became rather reluctant founder members of the League of Wales. Since then it has finished runners-up in the league in both 1995–96 and 1997–98, and subsequently played UEFA cup ties against Skonto Riga of Latvia and Wisła Kraków of Poland.

Newtown Association Football Club are one of the oldest clubs in Wales, being formed in 1875 and are one of the founder members of the FAW. In addition, the club was also one of the founder members of the League of Wales, now known as the Cymru Premier.

The club has a long and proud tradition with the move in the late 1980s into the Northern Premier League being part of the progressive nature of the club.

Way back in 1877, Newtown took part in the first Welsh Cup tie on Saturday 13 October against Druids of Ruabon. Cefn Druids now former members of the Welsh Premier are derived from this club. Wrexham went on to win the competition but in the following season, Newtown White Stars beat the favourites Wrexham 2–1 in Oswestry and became the first club to receive the famous trophy, which had only been purchased a few months earlier. In December 1895 Newtown travelled to play Manchester City at Maine Road and shocked the City team by winning 3–2. Newtown’s W. Parry scored all three goals for the Robins.

In 2014 Newtown became the second Cymru Premier club, after The New Saints, to change their grass turf for a 3G pitch. During the 2014–15 season Newtown finished in the top six for the second consecutive season. They also took part in their first Welsh Cup final in 118 Years after memorable wins against Caersws, Bangor and Rhyl. However they lost the match 2–0 to The New Saints, despite it being played at Latham Park in front of a capacity crowd. After the cup final defeat, Newtown entered the European play-offs. During the play-offs, they won away at Port Talbot Town and won away at Aberystwyth Town to take a spot in the 2015–16 Europa League qualifiers.

In July 2015 Newtown faced Maltese opponents Valletta in the first round of qualifying for the 2015-16 Europa League. A last minute winner in the 1st leg at Latham Park gave the club their first European win and was followed with an away victory giving Newtown their first Europa League Win over two legs. Newtown faced Danish giants Copenhagen in the second round and were defeated over both legs losing 5–1 on aggregate. Newtown finished in the top 6 again during the following 2015-16 Welsh Premier League season and were also the only team to beat The New Saints at Park Hall, but eventually lost at home to Airbus UK Broughton in the play-off semi final. Newtown again reached the play-offs after finishing 7th in the 2016-17 Welsh Premier League season, but were beaten 3–2 away to Bangor City.

Honours 

Welsh Cup:
Winners: 1878–79, 1894–95
Runner-up: 1880–81, 1885–86, 1887–88, 1896–97, 2014–15

League Cup:
Runner-up: 2011/12
League of Wales:
Runner-up: 1995–96, 1997–98
 Welsh Amateur Cup:
Winners: 1954–55
Mid Wales League:
Winners: 2008–09  (Reserves)
 Ladies Welsh Cup:Finalists: 2003–04 
Mid Wales League:
Winners: 1975–76, 1978–79, 1981–82, 1986–87, 1987–88, 1995–96 (Reserves)
Summer Cup:
Winners: 1994–95, 1995–96
Mid Wales South League:
Winners: 1981–82, 1983–84 (Reserves)

Arthur Barritt Cup:
Winners: 1986–87
Welsh Intermediate Cup:
Finalists: 1985–86, 1987–88
Central Wales Cup:
Winners: 1992–93, 1993–94
Central Wales Floodlit Cup:
Winners: 1994–95
Mid Wales League Cup:
Winners: 1994–95, 1997–98
Montgomeryshire Cup:
Winners: 1936–37, 1968–69, 1947–48, 1949–50, 1951–52, 1954–55, 1955–56, 1956–57, 1957–58, 1965–66, 1966–67, 1967–68, 1968–69, 1978–79, 1981–82, 1995–96
Radnorshire Cup:
Winners: 1980–81 (Reserves)
Finalists: 1969–70, 1986–87 (Reserves)
UEFA Cup/Europa League:
Preliminary Round Qualifiers: 1996–97, 1998–99, 2015–16
Shropshire League:
Winners: 1892–93

Current squad

Technical staff

Managers 

 Brian Coyne (1992–03)
 Roger Preece (2003–06)
 Darren Ryan (2006–10)
 Andy Cale (2010–11)
 Darren Ryan (2011)
 Bernard McNally (2011–13)
 Chris Hughes (2013–)

Europe 

Newtown have participated in UEFA competition five times.

Notes
 PR: Preliminary round
 1Q: First qualifying round
 2Q: Second qualifying round

Rivalries 
Newtown share a local rivalry with Caersws who are only around 5 miles away and often attract big crowds when the teams meet. In the Cymru Premier Newtown have derby matches against fellow Mid-Wales clubs Aberystwyth Town and The New Saints.

League Record

References

External links 

Whitestars website

Cymru Premier clubs
Mid Wales Football League clubs
Northern Premier League clubs
Sport in Powys
Football clubs in Wales
Association football clubs established in 1875
1875 establishments in Wales
AFC